Acianthera circumplexa is a species of orchid plant native to Mexico.

References 

circumplexa
Flora of Mexico